Juan Ignacio Chela (born 30 August 1979), nicknamed as “El Flaco” or “Liliano,” is a former professional tennis player from Argentina. Chela was given a three-month ban from the professional tour in 2001 for failing a drugs test. Post-doping ban, Chela went on to reach the quarterfinals of the 2004 and 2011 French Open, and the 2007 US Open, attaining a career-high singles ranking of world No. 15 in August 2004.

Chela is currently the coach of Argentinian tennis player Diego Schwartzman.

Career

2000-2001: Failed drugs test and doping suspension
In April 2001, Chela was found to have failed a routine drugs test (in August 2000) - testing positive for the banned steroid methyltestosterone - and was given a three-month ban, as well as being made to forfeit all prize money and ranking points accumulated over the previous eight months since testing positive.

2004
In February, he reached the quarterfinals in Salvador, defeating Flavio Saretta and David Ferrer, before falling to Agustín Calleri, 3–6, 6–3, 3–6. He won in doubles at Viña del Mar, partnering Gastón Gaudio.

At Acapulco and Indian Wells, he reached the quarterfinals, but lost to Oscar Hernandez Perez and Roger Federer, respectively. In Acapulco, he also reached the final in doubles, partnering Nicolás Massú, but they lost to the Bryan brothers, 2–6, 3–6.

In April, Chela won in Estoril against Marat Safin, 6–7, 6–3, 6–3. He also won in doubles, partnering Gastón Gaudio.

He reached the quarterfinals of the French Open, where he lost to Tim Henman, 2–6, 4–6, 4–6. In doubles, he reached the quarterfinals in Rome, where he and Guillermo Cañas lost to the Bryan brothers, and in Hamburg, where he also partnered with Cañas.

On August 9, 2004, he reached his career-high singles ranking of world No. 15.

2005
Chela (The Torino) was involved in a controversy during a third-round loss to Lleyton Hewitt in the Australian Open in 2005, when he attempted to spit on Hewitt.

2006
As part of the Argentine team for the Davis Cup, he holds a record of six victories and four losses, the most important of his victories in April 2006, giving Argentina the third point to beat defending champions Croatia in the quarterfinals.

2007
In May 2007, he appeared in the quarterfinals of his sixth different Masters event at Rome, also his personal best showing, with wins over Marc Gicquel, Igor Andreev, and world No. 3 Andy Roddick, the latter being Chela's best victory since defeating No. 3 Yevgeny Kafelnikov in the second round in Mallorca in May 2000. He also partnered Pablo Cuevas in doubles, reaching the quarterfinals in Barcelona, where they lost to the Bryan brothers 1–6, 2–6.

In July, he reached the semifinals in Stuttgart, where he lost to Stan Wawrinka, 7–6, 4–6, 1–6.

He reached the quarterfinals of the US Open, but lost to David Ferrer, 2–6, 3–6, 5–7.

In October, he reached the quarter-finals in Vienna, where he lost to Novak Djokovic, 3–6, 7–5, 6–7. He also reached the semifinals in doubles, partnering Fernando González.

2008
In February, he reached the semifinals in Buenos Aires, only to lose to David Nalbandian, 1–6, 2–6.

In April, he reached the quarterfinals in Barcelona, where he lost to Rafael Nadal, 4–6, 2–6.

2009
In 2009, Chela played mostly Challenger tournaments, although he did reach the quarterfinals in Viña del Mar, where he lost to Tommy Robredo 6–0, 3–6, 4–6.

2010
In 2010, Chela won the US Men's Clay Court Championship in Houston, beating Sam Querrey 5–7, 6–4, 6–3, for his first ATP Tour championship in over three years. After he beat Rajeev Ram in straight sets, Chela won a controversial three-set second-round match, in which fellow countryman Eduardo Schwank was fined for his use of tactics when injured. Chela then beat defending champion Lleyton Hewitt and another Argentine Horacio Zeballos in straight sets to reach the final. Also in 2010, Chela won the BCR Open Romania in singles, defeating Pablo Andújar in the final 7–5, 6–1, and doubles partnering Łukasz Kubot. The singles title was his sixth career ATP World Tour victory.

2011

He reached the quarterfinals in Vienna and Santiago, and the semifinals in Costa do Sauipe, where he lost to Nicolás Almagro 6–1, 2–6, 4–6. He reached the final in Buenos Aires, where he again lost to Almagro, 3–6, 6–3, 4–6. In doubles, he reached the semifinals in Santiago, partnering Santiago González.

In April, he reached the final in doubles in Monte Carlo, partnering Bruno Soares, but they lost to the Bryan brothers, 3–6, 2–6.

He reached the quarterfinals of the French Open, where he lost to Andy Murray, 6–7, 5–7, 2–6. In August, he reached the semifinals in Kitzbühel, where he lost to Albert Montañés, 2–6, 4–7.

He reached his career-high doubles ranking of world No. 32 on 6 June 2011.

At the US Open, he made the third round, where he was defeated by young American Donald Young, 7–5, 6–4, 6–3.

His trainer and fitness coach (and also a close friend) is Fernando Gonzáles.

2012
Chela did not make any ATP Tour finals in 2012, either in singles or in doubles. He did reach the third round of Wimbledon doubles, along with his partner Eduardo Schwank, losing to Daniele Bracciali and Julian Knowle, 5–7, 5–7, 1–6. He also reached the singles semifinals in Viña del Mar, where he lost to Carlos Berlocq, 3–6, 6–4, 0–6. He also reached the doubles semifinals in Acapulco with Schwank.

ATP career finals

Singles: 12 (6–6)

Doubles: 6 (3–3)

Performance timelines

Singles

Doubles

Top-10 wins

See also
 List of sportspeople sanctioned for doping offences

References

External links
 
 
 

1979 births
Living people
Argentine male tennis players
Argentine sportspeople in doping cases
Doping cases in tennis
Hopman Cup competitors
Olympic tennis players of Argentina
People from Buenos Aires Province
Tennis players from Buenos Aires
Tennis players at the 2000 Summer Olympics
Tennis players at the 2004 Summer Olympics